Dmitri Osipov (born May 27, 1979) is a Russian former professional ice hockey defenceman. During the 1998–99 season he played with CSK VVS Samara of the Russian Superleague during both the regular season and playoffs.

Osipov last played with HC Levy of the Ukrainian Professional Hockey League during the 2013 playoffs.

References

External links

1979 births
Living people
HC CSK VVS Samara players
Khimik-SKA Novopolotsk players
Russian ice hockey defencemen
Sportspeople from Tolyatti